Associazione Calcio Milan enjoyed perhaps the greatest season in its history, winning three trophies, most memorable for the 4–0 victory against FC Barcelona in the Champions League Final in Athens. That game saw a goal explosion from a Milan side that had been extremely defensive during the entire league season. Milan won Serie A for a third consecutive time with a mere 36 goals scored in 34 games, but conceding a mere 15, which was largely down to their strong defensive line, with Franco Baresi and Paolo Maldini as key players to thank for their third consecutive domestic success. Milan's match against struggling Reggiana at San Siro on 1 May 1994 came on a day when the sporting world was overshadowed with the death of Formula One racing driver Ayrton Senna in the 1994 San Marino Grand Prix, but the football world was focused on AC Milan's attempts to seal a 13th title. It was a narrow 1–0 defeat for Reggiana, with a goal from Massimiliano Esposito, but mathematically enough to seal the Scudetto by league trophy handover ceremony.

Overview

Players

Transfers

Winter

Competitions

Serie A

League table

Results by round

Matches

Top scorers
  Daniele Massaro 11
  Jean-Pierre Papin 5
  Zvonimir Boban 4
  Demetrio Albertini 3
  Marco Simone 3

Coppa Italia

Second round

Third round

Supercoppa Italiana

European Cup

First round

Second round

UEFA Champions League

Group stage

Semi-final

Final

Intercontinental Cup

European Super Cup

Statistics

Players statistics

See also
 1993–94 Serie A

References

Sources
  RSSSF - Italy 1993/94

A.C. Milan seasons
Milan
1994
UEFA Champions League-winning seasons